The women's javelin throw at the 2008 Summer Olympics took place on 19–21 August at the Beijing National Stadium.

The qualifying standards were 60.50 m (A standard) and 56.00 m (B standard).

Mariya Abakumova held the lead from her first throw, with Barbora Špotáková the only other competitor within 3 metres. Abakumova improved to 70.78 on her fourth throw. Christina Obergföll took third place, and Goldie Sayers took fourth (with a British national record); both of these positions were gained from their first round throws with no improvement thereafter. Then Špotáková threw 71.42 on her final throw to win the gold medal, with Abakumova taking silver.

Eight years after the competition, the IOC retested samples from the event in connection with the Russian doping scandal. Mariya Abakumova tested positive for chlorodehydromethyltestosterone (turinabol), so she was disqualified and stripped of her silver medal, which was reallocated to Christina Obergföll. On 26 July 2018, the Court of Arbitration for Sport (CAS) confirmed the award of the bronze medal to Goldie Sayers.

Schedule
All times are China standard time (UTC+8)

Records
Prior to this competition, the existing world and Olympic records were as follows:

No new world or Olympic records were set for this event.

Results

Qualifying round
Qualification: 61.50 (Q) or at least 12 best performers (q) advance to the final.

Final

References

Athletics at the 2008 Summer Olympics
Javelin throw at the Olympics
2008 in women's athletics
Women's events at the 2008 Summer Olympics